Teresa Borrell (born 19 May 1962 in Lyttelton, New Zealand) is a shooting competitor for New Zealand. At the 2002 Commonwealth Games she won a gold medal in the  Double Trap (Pairs) event partnering Nadine Stanton.

She also competed at the 2000 Olympic Games.

References

1962 births
Living people
New Zealand female sport shooters
Trap and double trap shooters
Olympic shooters of New Zealand
Shooters at the 2002 Commonwealth Games
Shooters at the 2006 Commonwealth Games
Commonwealth Games gold medallists for New Zealand
Shooters at the 2000 Summer Olympics
Commonwealth Games medallists in shooting
20th-century New Zealand women
21st-century New Zealand women
Medallists at the 2002 Commonwealth Games
Medallists at the 2006 Commonwealth Games